In transcendental number theory, a mathematical discipline, Baker's theorem gives a lower bound for the absolute value of linear combinations of logarithms of algebraic numbers.
Baker used this to prove the transcendence of many numbers, to derive effective bounds for the solutions of some Diophantine equations, and to solve the class number problem of finding all imaginary quadratic fields with class number 1.

History
To simplify notation, let  be the set of logarithms to the base e of nonzero algebraic numbers, that is

where  denotes the set of complex numbers and  denotes the algebraic numbers (the algebraic completion of the rational numbers ). Using this notation, several results in transcendental number theory become much easier to state.

In 1934, Alexander Gelfond and Theodor Schneider independently proved the Gelfond–Schneider theorem. This result is usually stated as: if  is algebraic and not equal to 0 or 1, and if  is algebraic and irrational, then  is transcendental. The exponential function is multi-valued for complex exponents, and this applies to all of its values, which in most cases constitute infinitely many numbers. Equivalently, though, it says that if  are linearly independent over the rational numbers, then they are linearly independent over the algebraic numbers. It cannot be an algebraic irrational number like .

This problem was solved fourteen years later by Alan Baker and has since had numerous applications not only to transcendence theory but in algebraic number theory and the study of Diophantine equations as well. Baker received the Fields medal in 1970 for both this work and his applications of it to Diophantine equations.

Statement
With the above notation, Baker's theorem is a nonhomogeneous generalization of the Gelfond–Schneider theorem. Specifically it states:

Just as the Gelfond–Schneider theorem is equivalent to the statement about the transcendence of numbers of the form ab, so too Baker's theorem implies the transcendence of numbers of the form

where the bi are all algebraic, irrational, and 1, b1, …, bn are linearly independent over the rationals, and the ai are all algebraic and not 0 or 1.

 also gave several versions with explicit constants. For example, if  has height at most  and all the numbers  have height at most  then the linear form

is either 0 or satisfies

where

An explicit result by Baker and Wüstholz for a linear form Λ with integer coefficients yields a lower bound of the form

where

and d is the degree of the number field generated by the

Baker's method
The main ideas of the proof are illustrated by the proof of the following qualitative version of the theorem of  described by : 

If the numbers  are linearly independent over the rational numbers, for nonzero algebraic numbers  then they are linearly independent over the algebraic numbers. 

The precise quantitative version of Baker's theory can be proved by replacing the conditions that things are zero by conditions that things are sufficiently small throughout the proof.

The main idea of Baker's proof is to construct an auxiliary function  of several variables that vanishes to high order at many points of the form  then repeatedly show that it vanishes to lower order at even more points of this form. Finally the fact that it vanishes (to order 1) at enough points of this form implies using Vandermonde determinants that there is a multiplicative relation between the numbers ai.

Construction of the auxiliary function
Assume there is a relation

for algebraic numbers α1, …, αn, β1, …, βn−1. The function Φ is of the form

This is possible because these conditions are homogeneous linear equations in the coefficients p, which have a non-zero solution provided the number of unknown variables p is larger than the number of equations. The linear relation between the logs of the α's is needed to cut down the number of linear equations that have to be satisfied. Moreover, using Siegel's lemma, the sizes of the coefficients p can be chosen to be not too large. The constants L, h, and M have to be carefully adjusted so that the next part of the proof works, and are subject to some constraints, which are roughly:

L must be somewhat smaller than M to make the argument about extra zeros below work.
A small power of h must be larger than L to make the final step of the proof work.
Ln must be larger than about Mn−1h in order that it is possible to solve for the coefficients p.

The constraints can be satisfied by taking h to be sufficiently large, M to be some fixed power of h, and L to be a slightly smaller power of h. Baker took M to be about h2 and L to be about h2−1/2n.

The linear relation between the logarithms of the α's is used to reduce L slightly; roughly speaking, without it the condition Ln must be larger than about Mn−1h would become Ln must be larger than about Mnh, which is incompatible with the condition that L is somewhat smaller than M.

Zeros of the auxiliary function
The next step is to show that Φ vanishes to slightly smaller order at many more points of the form  for integers l. This idea was Baker's key innovation: previous work on this problem involved trying to increase the number of derivatives that vanish while keeping the number of points fixed, which does not seem to work in the multivariable case. This is done by combining two ideas; First one shows that the derivatives at these points are quite small, by using the fact that many derivatives of Φ vanish at many nearby points. Then one shows that derivatives of Φ at this point are given by algebraic integers times known constants. If an algebraic integer has all its conjugates bounded by a known constant, then it cannot be too small unless it is zero, because the product of all conjugates of a nonzero algebraic integer is at least 1 in absolute value. Combining these two ideas implies that Φ vanishes to slightly smaller order at many more points  This part of the argument requires that Φ does not increase too rapidly; the growth of Φ depends on the size of L, so requires a bound on the size of L, which turns out to be roughly that L must be somewhat smaller than M. More precisely, Baker showed that since Φ vanishes to order M at h consecutive integers, it also vanishes to order M/2 at h1+1/8n consecutive integers 1, 2, 3, …. Repeating this argument J times shows that Φ vanishes to order M/2J at h1+J/8n points, provided that h is sufficiently large and L is somewhat smaller than M/2J.

One then takes J large enough that:

(J larger than about 16n will do if h2 > L) so that:

Completion of the proof

By definition  can be written as:

Therefore as l varies we have a system of (L + 1)n homogeneous linear equations in the (L + 1)n unknowns which by assumption has a non-zero solution, which in turn implies the determinant of the matrix of coefficients must vanish. However this matrix is a Vandermonde matrix and the formula for the determinant of such a matrix forces an equality between two of the values:

so  are multiplicatively dependent. Taking logs shows that  are linearly dependent over the rationals.

Extensions and generalizations
 in fact gave a quantitative version of the theorem, giving effective lower bounds for the linear form in logarithms. This is done by a similar argument, except statements about something being zero are replaced by statements giving a small upper bound for it, and so on.

 showed how to eliminate the assumption about 2πi in the theorem. This requires a modification of the final step of the proof. One shows that many derivatives of the function  vanish at z = 0, by an argument similar to the one above. But these equations for the first (L+1)n derivatives again give a homogeneous set of linear equations for the coefficients p, so the determinant is zero, and is again a Vandermonde determinant, this time for the numbers . So two of these expressions must be the same which shows that log α1,…,log αn are linearly dependent over the rationals.

 gave an inhomogeneous version of the theorem, showing that 

is nonzero for nonzero algebraic numbers β0, …, βn, α1, …, αn, and moreover giving an effective lower bound for it. The proof is similar to the homogeneous case: one can assume that 

and one inserts an extra variable z0 into Φ as follows:

Corollaries
As mentioned above, the theorem includes numerous earlier transcendence results concerning the exponential function, such as the Hermite–Lindemann theorem and Gelfond–Schneider theorem. It is not quite as encompassing as the still unproven Schanuel's conjecture, and does not imply the six exponentials theorem nor, clearly, the still open four exponentials conjecture.

The main reason Gelfond desired an extension of his result was not just for a slew of new transcendental numbers. In 1935 he used the tools he had developed to prove the Gelfond–Schneider theorem to derive a lower bound for the quantity

Baker's proof gave lower bounds for quantities like the above but with arbitrarily many terms, and he could use these bounds to develop effective means of tackling Diophantine equations and to solve Gauss' class number problem.

Extensions
Baker's theorem grants us the linear independence over the algebraic numbers of logarithms of algebraic numbers. This is weaker than proving their algebraic independence. So far no progress has been made on this problem at all. It has been conjectured that if λ1, …, λn are elements of  that are linearly independent over the rational numbers, then they are algebraically independent too. This is a special case of Schanuel's conjecture, but so far it remains to be proved that there even exist two algebraic numbers whose logarithms are algebraically independent. Indeed, Baker's theorem rules out linear relations between logarithms of algebraic numbers unless there are trivial reasons for them; the next most simple case, that of ruling out homogeneous quadratic relations, is the still open four exponentials conjecture.

Similarly, extending the result to algebraic independence but in the p-adic setting, and using the p-adic logarithm function, remains an open problem. It is known that proving algebraic independence of linearly independent p-adic logarithms of algebraic p-adic numbers would prove Leopoldt's conjecture on the p-adic ranks of units of a number field.

See also
 Analytic subgroup theorem

Notes

References

.

Transcendental numbers
Theorems in number theory